Michael Emmet Walsh (born March 22, 1935) is an American actor who has appeared in over 200 films and television series, including small but important supporting roles in dozens of major studio features of the 1970s and 1980s. He starred in Blood Simple (1984), the Coen Brothers' first film  for which he won the Independent Spirit Award for Best Male Lead. He also appeared in Carl Reiner's comedy The Jerk (1979), Robert Redford's drama Ordinary People (1980), Ridley Scott's science fiction film Blade Runner (1982), Barry Sonnenfeld's steampunk western Wild Wild West (1999) and Brad Bird's animated film The Iron Giant (1999). Roger Ebert said that "No movie featuring either Harry Dean Stanton or M. Emmet Walsh in a supporting role can be altogether bad."

Early life 
Walsh was born in Ogdensburg, New York, the son of Agnes Katharine (née Sullivan) and Harry Maurice Walsh Sr., a customs agent. He is of Irish descent. He was raised in rural Swanton, Vermont, and attended Clarkson University.

He graduated in 1958 (B.A., Business Administration). In 1998, the Clarkson Alumni Association presented him with the Golden Knight Award.

Career 

Walsh came to prominence in the 1978 crime film Straight Time, in which he played a parole officer. He also had a small but memorable role as a crazed sniper in the Steve Martin comedy The Jerk. One of his best-known roles was Captain Harry Bryant in Ridley Scott's cult film Blade Runner. His most acclaimed performance was arguably the double-crossing private detective in Blood Simple (1984), for which he won the 1986 Independent Spirit Award for Best Male Lead.

Walsh made occasional guest appearances on Home Improvement as Tim Taylor's father-in-law. In 1992, he appeared as a powerful U.S. Senator in David Winning's Killer Image. In Christmas with the Kranks, he played one of the Kranks' neighbors. He also appeared as Alex Lembeck, a motorcycle cop who appointed himself as Sandy Stockton's chaperone and protector on The Sandy Duncan Show in 1972. He appeared in an episode of the NBC drama series Gibbsville in 1976 and Little House on the Prairie in 1981. He appeared as Dr. Joseph Kroft, a medical examiner with a grudge against Sipowicz, on an episode of "NYPD Blue".

Some comedy roles include the cynical small town sportswriter Dickie Dunn in the iconic 1977 hockey film Slap Shot, and a college diving coach in the Rodney Dangerfield film Back to School.

Filmography

Film

Television

References

External links
 
 

1935 births
Living people
American male film actors
American male television actors
American male voice actors
American people of Irish descent
Clarkson University alumni
Independent Spirit Award for Best Male Lead winners
Male actors from New York (state)
People from Ogdensburg, New York
People from Swanton (town), Vermont
Tilton School alumni